Gladstone is a civil parish in Sunbury County, New Brunswick, Canada.

For governance purposes it is divided between the villages of Fredericton Junction and Tracy and the local service district of the parish of Gladstone, all of which are members of Regional Service Commission 11 (RSC11).

Origin of name
The parish was named in honour of William Ewart Gladstone, Prime Minister of the United Kingdom until his defeat shortly after the House of Assembly began its 1874 session.

History
Gladstone was erected in 1874 from Blissville Parish.

In 1896 the land boundary with Blissville was changed to run along grant lines and magnetic bearing,

Boundaries
Gladstone Parish is bounded:

 on the north by a line beginning at a point on the York County line about 3.3 kilometres southwesterly of Route 101, then running south 66º east to the Oromocto River;
 on the east and southeast by a line running up the Oromocto River and the South Branch Oromocto River to the northern line of a grant to Nathaniel Hubbard, which also serves as the southern boundary of Fredericton Junction, then southwesterly along the line to the rear of the grant, then southerly about 2.2 kilometres along the rear line of grants, then south 67º west to the Charlotte County line;
 on the south by the Charlotte County line;
 on the northwest by the York County line.

Communities
Communities at least partly within the parish; bold indicates an incorporated municipality

 Bailey
 Fredericton Junction
 Little Lake
 Three Tree Creek
 Tracy
 Klondike Settlement
 Tracyville
 Upper Tracy
 Vespra

Bodies of water
Bodies of water at least partly in the parish:

 Oromocto River
 North Branch Oromocto River
 Peltoma Outlet
 Piskahegan Stream
 Porcupine Stream
 Yoho Stream
 Hardwood Creek
 Shaw Creek
 Shin Creek
 Three Tree Creek
 Peltoma Lake

Islands
Islands in the parish:
 Curries Island
 MacGougans Island

Other notable places
Parks, historic sites, and other noteworthy places in the parish.
 Russel Dam

Demographics
Parish population total does not include Fredericton Junction or Tracy

Population
Population trend

Language
Mother tongue (2016)

Access Routes
Highways and numbered routes that run through the parish, including external routes that start or finish at the parish limits:

Highways
None

Principal Routes

Secondary Routes:

External Routes:
None

See also
List of parishes in New Brunswick

Notes

References

Parishes of Sunbury County, New Brunswick
Greater Fredericton
Local service districts of Sunbury County, New Brunswick